Jennifer Lawrence is an American actress who has received multiple awards and nominations throughout her career, including an Academy Award, a British Academy Film Award, three Golden Globe Awards, four Critics' Choice Awards, two Screen Actors Guild Awards, seven MTV Movie Awards, five People's Choice Awards, and eight Teen Choice Awards.

After playing minor roles in several films and television shows, Lawrence starred in her first major role on the TBS sitcom The Bill Engvall Show (2007–2009), which earned her a Young Artist Award for Outstanding Young Performer in a TV Series. In 2008, she won the Marcello Mastroianni Award at the 65th Venice International Film Festival for the drama The Burning Plain. For her breakout role as a poverty-stricken teenager Ree Dolly in the 2010 acclaimed independent coming-of-age mystery drama Winter's Bone, 20-year-old Jennifer received her first nomination for the Academy Award for Best Actress in a Leading Role, becoming the second-youngest Best Actress nominee at the time. The film also garnered her Best Actress nominations from the Hollywood Foreign Press, BAFTA, SAG, and Critics' Choice award ceremonies, and won a Breakthrough Performance Award from the National Board of Review. In 2011, she received several nominations for her portrayal of Mystique in X-Men: First Class, including the People's Choice and Teen Choice Awards ceremonies.

Lawrence won several awards for both her 2012 releases. For her performance in the comedy-drama Silver Linings Playbook, she won the Golden Globe Award for Best Actress – Comedy, the SAG Award for Outstanding Lead Actress, and the Academy Award for Best Actress, becoming the second-youngest winner in the category. The same year, she won the Saturn Award for Best Actress, the Empire Award for Best Actress, the MTV Movie Award for Best Female Performance, and the Critics' Choice Movie Award for Best Actress in an Action Movie for portraying the heroine Katniss Everdeen in The Hunger Games. The following year, her performance as a troubled wife in American Hustle (2013) won her the Golden Globe and BAFTA Award for Best Supporting Actress, and a Screen Actors Guild Award for Outstanding Performance by a Cast in a Motion Picture, and also garnered her the nominations for a Screen Actors Guild Award for Outstanding Supporting Actress and the Academy Award for Best Supporting Actress.

From 2013–2015, she received several awards and nominations for her performances in the other three films in The Hunger Games series, including the MTV Best Female Performance Award for Catching Fire, and three Critics Choice nominations for each films. The role of Katniss Everdeen made Guinness World Records to recognize Lawrence as the highest-grossing action heroine of all time. Her reprisal of Mystique in X-Men: Days of Future Past (2014) earned her two People's Choice Awards for Favorite Actress and Favorite Action Movie Actress. In 2015, she starred as the Joy Mangano in the biopic Joy, which won her third Golden Globe Award in the Best Actress – Motion Picture Comedy or Musical category, and another Academy Award for Best Actress nomination, making her the youngest person to receive four Oscar nominations.

AACTA International Awards
The Australian Academy of Cinema and Television Arts Awards are presented annually by the Australian Academy of Cinema and Television Arts (AACTA) to recognize and honor achievements in the film and television industry. Lawrence has won two awards.

Academy Awards
The Academy Awards are a set of awards given by the Academy of Motion Picture Arts and Sciences annually for excellence of cinematic achievements. Lawrence has won one award from four nominations.

British Academy Film Awards
The British Academy Film Award is an annual award show presented by the British Academy of Film and Television Arts. Lawrence has received one award from two nominations.

Critics' Choice Movie Awards
The Critics' Choice Movie Awards are presented annually since 1995 by the Broadcast Film Critics Association for outstanding achievements in the cinema industry. Lawrence has received four awards from thirteen nominations.

Critics' Choice Super Awards
The Critics' Choice Super Awards is an awards show presented annually by the Critics Choice Association to honor the finest in genre fiction film, television and home media releases, including action, superhero, horror, science fiction, fantasy, and animation releases. Lawrence has been nominated once.

Dorian Awards
The Dorian Awards are presented by the Gay and Lesbian Entertainment Critics Association (GALECA). Lawrence has been nominated once.

Empire Awards
The Empire Awards is a British awards ceremony held annually to recognize cinematic achievements. Lawrence has received one award from five nominations.

Golden Globe Awards
The Golden Globe Award is an accolade bestowed by the 93 members of the Hollywood Foreign Press Association (HFPA) recognizing excellence in film and television, both domestic and foreign. Lawrence has received three awards from five nominations.

Golden Raspberry Awards
The Golden Raspberry Award is a mock award presented in recognition of the worst in film. Lawrence has received one nomination.

Gotham Awards
Presented by the Independent Filmmaker Project, the Gotham Awards award the best in independent film. Lawrence has won one award from three nominations.

Guinness World Records
The Guinness World Records is a reference book published annually, containing a collection of world records, both human achievements and the extremes of the natural world.

Hollywood Film Festival
The Hollywood Film Awards are held annually to recognize talent in the film industry. Lawrence has received one award.

Independent Spirit Awards
The Independent Spirit Awards are presented annually by Film Independent, to award best in the independent film community. Lawrence has received one award from two nominations.

Irish Film & Television Awards
The Irish Film & Television Academy Awards are presented annually to award best in films and television. Lawrence has received two nominations.

Los Angeles Film Festival
Founded in 1995, the Los Angeles Film Festival is an annual film festival held in June. Lawrence has received one award.

MTV Movie Awards
The MTV Movie Awards is an annual award show presented by MTV to honor outstanding achievements in films. Founded in 1992, the winners of the awards are decided online by the audience. Lawrence has received seven awards from twenty-two nominations.

National Board of Review
The National Board of Review was founded in 1909 in New York City to award "film, domestic and foreign, as both art and entertainment". Lawrence has received one award.

Nickelodeon Kids' Choice Awards
The Nickelodeon Kids' Choice Awards, also known as the Kids Choice Awards (KCAs), is an annual awards show that airs on the Nickelodeon cable channel that honors the year's biggest television, film, and music acts, as voted by Nickelodeon viewers. Lawrence has received four awards from six nominations.

Palm Springs International Film Festival
Founded in 1989 in Palm Springs, California, the Palm Springs International Film Festival is held annually in January. Lawrence has won two awards.

People's Choice Awards
The People's Choice Awards is an American awards show recognizing the people and the work of popular culture. The show has been held annually since 1975, and is voted on by the general public.
Lawrence has received six awards from eleven nominations.

Santa Barbara International Film Festival
Founded in 1986, the Santa Barbara International Film Festival is an eleven-day film festival held in Santa Barbara, California. Lawence has received one award.

Satellite Awards
The Satellite Awards are a set of annual awards given by the International Press Academy. Lawrence has received one award from three nominations.

Saturn Awards
The Saturn Awards are presented annually by the Academy of Science Fiction, Fantasy, and Horror Films to honor science fiction, fantasy, and horror films, television, and home video. Lawrence has received one award and two nominations.

Screen Actors Guild Awards
The Screen Actors Guild Awards are organized by the Screen Actors Guild‐American Federation of Television and Radio Artists. First awarded in 1995, the awards aim to recognize excellent achievements in film and television. Lawrence has received two awards from five nominations.

Seattle International Film Festival
Founded in 1976, the Seattle International Film Festival is a twenty five-day film festival held in Washington, North America. Lawrence has received one award.

Spike Guys' Choice Awards
The Spike Guys' Choice Awards was annually held by television channel Spike.

Stockholm International Film Festival
Founded in 1990, the Stockholm International Film Festival is an annual film festival held in Sweden. Lawrence has received one award.

Teen Choice Awards
The Teen Choice Awards is an annual awards show that airs on the Fox Network. The awards honor the year's biggest achievements in music, movies, sports, television, fashion, and other categories, voted by teen viewers. Lawrence has received eight awards from fourteen nominations.

Torino Film Festival
The Torino Film Festival (also known as Turin Film Festival) is an annual International film festival held in Turin, Italy.

Venice Film Festival
Founded in 1932, the Venice Film Festival, or Venice International Film Festival, is the oldest film festival in the world. Lawrence has won one award.

Critics associations

Notes

References

Lawrence, Jennifer